A plain is a flat, sweeping landmass.

Plain may also refer to:

Places
 Plain, Texas, U.S.
 Plain, Washington, U.S.
 Plain, Wisconsin, U.S.
 Plain City (disambiguation), several places
 Plain Township (disambiguation), several places

Music
 "Plain" (song), a 2020 song by Benee

See also
 
 Plains (disambiguation), including The Plains
 The Plain (disambiguation)
 Plaine (disambiguation)
 Plane (disambiguation)
 Plain people